Replica is the fourth fanclub release by British progressive metal band Threshold, released in 2004. It contains two unreleased songs, re-recordings and remixes from past albums.

Track list 

  "Static" - alternative version  (5.05)
  "Endless Sea" - previously unreleased  (4.48)
  "Fragmentation" - radio edit  (3.27)
  "Ground Control" - acoustic version  (3.48)
  "The Latent Gene" - uncut version  (9.12)
  "Torn To Shreds" - previously unreleased   (4.35)
  "Forever" - acoustic version  (3.26)
  "Light And Space" - radio edit  (4.09)
  "Surface To Air" - 2004 version  (9.56)
  "Opium" - synthetic remix  (5.02)

Musicians 

Mac: vocals
Karl Groom: guitar / acoustic
Nick Midson: guitar
Richard West: keyboards
Steve Anderson: bass +
Johanne James: drums +

(+ bass on 3,8 by Jon Jeary / 5,7 by Karl Groom, drums on 5 by Mark Heaney)

Threshold (band) albums
2004 remix albums